The men's individual pursuit competition at the 2019  UEC European Track Championships was held on 19 October 2019.

Results

Qualifying
The first two racers raced for gold, the third and fourth fastest rider raced for the bronze medal.

Finals

References

Men's individual pursuit
European Track Championships – Men's individual pursuit